Sir Gordon James Lethem, KCMG (16 September 1886 – 14 August 1962) was a British colonial administrator.

He was born in Leith, Scotland, the son of James Lethem and Marian Macintosh.

He was Governor of British Guiana from  7 November 1941 to 1946.  He was acting Governor from 1946 to 12 April 1947. He also served in Nigeria, the Seychelles, and the Leeward Islands. Lethem's papers are held in Bodleian Library at the University of Oxford.

After retiring from the civil service he became involved in politics. He was a member of the Liberal Party. In 1950 he was Vice-President of the Scottish Liberal Party.  He stood as a Liberal candidate at the United Kingdom general election of 1950 in the constituency of Banffshire. He finished third and did not stand for parliament again.

The city of Lethem, Guyana is named after him.

References

"Papers of Sir Gordon James Lethem" Bodleian Library

1886 births
1962 deaths
Governors of British Seychelles
Governors of British Guiana
British Guiana in World War II
Knights Commander of the Order of St Michael and St George
Knights of the Order of St John
Members of Lincoln's Inn
Liberal Party (UK) parliamentary candidates
Alumni of the University of Edinburgh
British people in British Nigeria